Jenny Diski FRSL (née Simmonds; 8 July 1947 – 28 April 2016) was an English writer. She had a troubled childhood, but was taken in and mentored by the novelist Doris Lessing; she lived in Lessing's house for four years. Diski was educated at University College London, and worked as a teacher during the 1970s and early 1980s.

Diski was a regular contributor to the London Review of Books; the collections Don't and A View from the Bed include articles and essays written for the publication. She won the 2003 Thomas Cook Travel Book Award for Stranger on a Train: Daydreaming and Smoking around America With Interruptions.

Early life 
Diski was a troubled teenager from a difficult, fractured home. Her parents were working-class Jewish immigrants to London. Her father, James Simmonds (born Israel Zimmerman), made his living on the black market. He deserted the family when Diski was aged six. This caused her mother, Rene (born Rachel Rayner), to have a nervous breakdown, and Diski was then put into foster care. Her father came back, but left permanently when she was aged eleven.

Diski spent much of her youth as a psychiatric inpatient or outpatient. At the same time, she immersed herself deeply in the culture of the 60s, from the Aldermaston marches to the Grosvenor Square Protests of 1968, from drugs to free love, from jazz to acid rock, and a flirtation with the ideas and methods of R. D. Laing. Taken into the London home of the novelist Doris Lessing, who was a school-friend's mother, Diski resumed her education and by the start of the 1970s was training as a teacher, starting the Freightliners free school and having her first publication.

Writings 
Over the decades, Diski was a prolific writer of fiction and non-fiction articles, reviews and books. Many of her early books tackle themes such as depression, sado-masochism and madness. Some of her later writings, such as Apology for the Woman Writing (about the French writer Marie de Gournay), strike a more positive note, while her spare, ironic tone, using all the resources of magic realism, provides a unique take on even the most distressing material. Compared at times with her mentor Lessing as both were concerned with the thinking woman, Diski was called a post-postmodernist for her abiding distrust of logical systems of thought, whether postmodern or not.

Fiction 
Diski wrote eleven novels. Her first novel Nothing Natural was about a sadomasochistic affair. Her only collection of short stories, The Vanishing Princess, published in England in 1995, was described as being about "pleasure, the writing life, the difficulties of family life, and the rules governing femininity."

Non-fiction 
In The Sixties, Diski described her experience as a young woman starting out in life: "I lived in London during that period, regretting the Beats, buying clothes, going to movies, dropping out, reading, taking drugs, spending time in mental hospitals, demonstrating, having sex, teaching". She also described the decade's pervasive sexism, institutionalised in the countercultural cult of casual sex, asserting that "On the basis that no means no, I was raped several times by men who arrived in my bed and wouldn't take no for an answer". In the book, Diski returns repeatedly to the question of how far the cult of the self in the permissive society gave rise to 1980s neoliberalism, greed and self-interest. She concludes that, in the words of Charles Shaar Murray, "The line from hippie to yuppie is not nearly as convoluted as people like to believe".

Her 1997 memoir Skating to Antarctica, ostensibly about a journey to see the Antarctic ice, also tells much about Diski's early life. Kirkus Reviews comments that "Antarctica is not so much a destination as a symptom in this intense, disturbing memoir of a wickedly unpleasant childhood." Diski likens the bleak whiteness of the icescape to the safety of the unbroken whiteness of the psychiatric hospital of her depressed youth. In her obituary of Diski, Kate Kellaway calls Skating to Antarctica "the most remarkable of her books. It stars her daughter, Chloe, who steers Diski into finding out what became of her mother, with whom relations had been severed for decades. The narrative alternates startlingly between a trip to the frozen south and this search—Diski's reluctant advance towards catharsis."

Her 2010 non-fiction work, What I Don't Know About Animals, examines the ambiguous status of pet animals in Western society, at once sentimentalised and brutalised, or all too often abandoned. Nicholas Lezard, reviewing the book in The Guardian, admires Diski as "one of the language's great, if under-appreciated, stylists", in this case where "her honest, direct and intelligent prose has produced an honest, direct and intelligent look at relations between ourselves and the animal world."

Diski's final, valedictory, book, In Gratitude, was published shortly before her death in 2016. In it, she "elegant[ly]" takes a tour of her life, knowing she was soon to die of an aggressive and inoperable cancer. She rejects the usual "cancer clichés", instead going back to her time with Lessing, meeting other famous literary figures including Robert Graves, Alan Sillitoe, Lindsay Anderson, and R. D. Laing. The Kirkus reviewer sums up the book as "Sometimes rueful, often oblique, but provocative and highly readable."

Personal life 
She married Roger Marks in 1976, and they jointly chose the name Diski. Their daughter Chloe was born in 1977. The couple separated in 1981 and divorced. Her later partner until the end of her life, Ian Patterson, known as "the Poet" in Diski's writings, is a poet, translator and was director of English Studies at Queens' College, Cambridge.

In June 2014, Diski was told that she had at best another three years to live. In September 2014, she announced that she had been diagnosed with inoperable lung cancer. She died on 28 April 2016.

Prizes 
 2003 J. R. Ackerley Prize for Autobiography for Stranger on a Train: Daydreaming and Smoking around America With Interruptions
 2003 Thomas Cook Travel Book Award for Stranger on a Train: Daydreaming and Smoking around America With Interruptions

Works

Fiction 
Nothing Natural (1986)
Rainforest (1987)
Like Mother (1988)
Then Again (1990)
Happily Ever After (1991)
Monkey's Uncle (1994)
The Vanishing Princess (1995) (short stories)
The Dream Mistress (1996)
After These Things (2004)
Only Human: A Comedy (2000)
Apology for the Woman Writing (2008)

Non-fiction 
Skating to Antarctica (1997) (memoir; Chapter 1) 
Don't (1998) (essays)
Stranger on a Train: Daydreaming and Smoking around America With Interruptions (2002) (travelogue)
A View from the Bed (2003) (essays)
On Trying to Keep Still (2006)
The Sixties (2009) (memoir)
What I Don’t Know About Animals (2010) (nature)
In Gratitude (2016) (memoir)
Why Didn't You Just Do What You Were Told? (2020) (essays)

References

External links 

Jenny Diski's blog
Diski's writings at the LRB

1947 births
2016 deaths
Deaths from lung cancer
Place of death missing
English travel writers
British women travel writers
English women novelists
Environmental fiction writers
Fellows of the Royal Society of Literature
English Jewish writers
People educated at St Christopher School, Letchworth
20th-century English novelists
20th-century English women writers
21st-century English novelists
21st-century English women writers
English women non-fiction writers